The Chinese Academy of Governance, usually mentioned as the National School of Administration by media, is an external name of the Central Party School of the Chinese Communist Party (CCP). Historically, it was a public administration academy for middle and senior government officials in China from 1994 to 2018. The academy was located at Beijing and sponsored by the State Council.  

Under the plan on deepening reform of Party and State Institutions, the academy was merged to the Central Party School of the Chinese Communist Party in March 2018. Its name is retained by the Central Party School as part of the "one institution with two names" system.

History
The Chinese Academy of Governance began construction in 1988 and officially opened in September 1994. It provided policy consultancy to government management and develops theoretical research in the field of public management. It reported directly to the State Council.

References

External links 

 

 
Educational institutions established in 1994
Universities and colleges in Haidian District
1994 establishments in China
State Council of the People's Republic of China
Central Party School of the Chinese Communist Party
One institution with multiple names